Killarney is a station on the Overbrook branch of the Port Authority of Allegheny County's light rail network. It is located in Castle Shannon, Pennsylvania. The station features no parking and connecting buses, but is located in a crowded residential neighborhood and provides easy access for local residents travelling to Downtown Pittsburgh.

References

External links

Port Authority T Station listings
Station from Killarney Drive from Google Maps Street View

Port Authority of Allegheny County stations
Railway stations in the United States opened in 2004
Blue Line (Pittsburgh)
Silver Line (Pittsburgh)